Hayim Nahman Bialik (January 9, 1873 – July 4, 1934) was a Jewish poet who wrote primarily in Hebrew but also in Yiddish. Bialik was one of the pioneers of modern Hebrew poetry. He was part of the vanguard of Jewish thinkers who gave voice to the breath of new life in Jewish life. Being a noted essayist and story-teller, Bialik also translated major works from European languages. Although he died before Israel became a state, Bialik ultimately came to be recognized as Israel's national poet.

Biography

Hayim Nahman Bialik was born in Radi, Volhynian Governorate in the Russian Empire to Itzik Yosef Bialik, a wood merchant from Zhytomyr, and his wife, Dinah Priveh. He had an older brother Sheftel (born in 1862) and two sisters Chenya-Ides (born in 1871) and  Blyuma (born in 1875). When Bialik  was 8 years old, his father died and his mother took him to Zhytomyr to live with his Orthodox grandfather, Yankl-Moishe Bialik. Bialik did not see his mother for twenty years, until he took her to live with him in Odessa.

In Zhytomyr he received a traditional Jewish religious education, but also explored European literature. At the age of 15, he convinced his grandfather to send him to the Volozhin Yeshiva in Lithuania to study under Rabbi Naftali Zvi Yehuda Berlin, where he hoped he could continue his Jewish schooling while expanding his knowledge of European literature Attracted to the Jewish Enlightenment movement (Haskala), Bialik drifted away from yeshiva life. There is a story in the biography of Rabbi Chaim Soloveitchik that cites an anonymous student reputed to be him. The story goes that Rabbi Chaim, after expelling Bialik from the yeshiva for being involved in the Haskala movement, personally escorted his former student out. When asked "Why?" the rabbi replied that he spent the time convincing Bialik not to use his writing talents against the yeshiva world.  Poems such as HaMatmid ("The Talmud student") written in 1898, reflect Bialik's great ambivalence toward that way of life: on the one hand admiration for the dedication and devotion of the yeshiva students to their studies, on the other hand a disdain for the narrowness of their world.

At 18 Bialik left for Odessa, the center of modern Jewish culture in the southern Russian Empire, drawn by admiration of Mendele Mocher Sforim and Ahad Ha'am. In Odessa, Bialik studied Russian and German language and literature and dreamed of enrolling in the Orthodox Rabbinical Seminary in Berlin. Alone and penniless, he made his living teaching Hebrew. The 1892 publication of his first poem, El Hatzipor "To the Bird", which expresses a longing for Zion, in a booklet edited by Yehoshua Ravnitzky (1859–1944) (a future collaborator), eased Bialik's way into Jewish literary circles in Odessa. He joined the Hovevei Zion movement and befriended Ahad Ha'am, who had a great influence on his Zionist outlook.

In 1892 Bialik heard news that the Volozhin Yeshiva had closed and returned home to Zhytomyr to prevent his grandfather from discovering that he had discontinued his religious education. He arrived to find both his grandfather and his older brother close to death. Following their deaths, Bialik married Manya Averbuch in 1893. For a time he served as a bookkeeper in his father-in-law's lumber business in Korostyshiv, near Kiev. But when this proved unsuccessful, he moved in 1897 to Sosnowiec, a small town in Zaglebie, southern Poland, which was then part of the Russian Empire, near the border with Prussia and Austria. In Sosnowiec, Bialik worked as a Hebrew teacher and tried to earn extra income as a coal merchant, but the provincial life depressed him. He was finally able to return to Odessa in 1900, having secured a teaching job.

Bialik's first visit to the US was to Hartford, CT, where he stayed with cousin Raymond Bialeck and his family. His closest living relatives in the US include Hal Bialeck, Alison Bialeck, and Richard Bialeck. He is the uncle of actress Mayim Bialik's great-great-grandfather.

Literary career

For the next two decades, Bialik taught and continued his activities in Zionist and literary circles, as his literary fame continued to rise. This is considered Bialik's "golden period". In 1901 his first collection of poetry was published in Warsaw, and was greeted with much critical acclaim, to the point that he was hailed "the poet of national renaissance." Bialik relocated to Warsaw briefly in 1904 as literary editor of the weekly magazine HaShiloah founded by Ahad Ha'am, a position he served for six years.

In 1903 Bialik was sent by the Jewish Historical Commission in Odessa to interview survivors of the Kishinev pogroms and prepare a report. In response to his findings Bialik wrote his epic poem "In the City of Slaughter", a powerful statement of anguish at the situation of the Jews. Max Dimont wrote that "Bialik's poem caused thousands of Jewish youths to cast off their pacifism and join the Russian underground to fight Czar and tyranny."

Bialik's condemnation of passivity against anti-Semitic violence is said to have influenced the founding Jewish self-defense groups in the Russian Empire, and eventually the Haganah in Palestine. Bialik visited Palestine in 1909.

It was during this 1903 visit to Odessa that Bialik first met Ira Jan, the painter whom he secretly loved, as revealed by Prof. Ziva Shamir in her book "A Track of Her Own".

In the early 20th century, together with Ravnitzky, Simcha Ben Zion and Elhanan Levinsky, Bialik founded a Hebrew publishing house, Moriah, which issued Hebrew classics and school texts.  He translated into Hebrew various European works, such as Shakespeare's Julius Caesar, Schiller's Wilhelm Tell, the Miguel de Cervantes novel Don Quixote, and Heine's poems; and from Yiddish S. Ansky's The Dybbuk.

Throughout the years 1899–1915, Bialik published about 20 of his Yiddish poems in different Yiddish periodicals in the Russian Empire. These poems are often considered to be among the best achievements of modern Yiddish poetry of that period. In collaboration with Ravnitzky, Bialik published Sefer HaAggadah (1908–1911, The Book of Legends), a three-volume edition of the folk tales and proverbs scattered through the Talmud. For the book they selected hundreds of texts and arranged them thematically. The Book of Legends was immediately recognized as a masterwork and has been reprinted numerous times. Bialik also edited the poems of the medieval poet and philosopher Ibn Gabirol.  He began a modern commentary on the Mishnah, but only completed Zeraim, the first of the six Orders. Bialik intentionally chose to use the traditional Vilna edition of the Mishnah instead of a more scientific text and created, arguably, the first modern commentary to a seder of Mishnah that included in its introduction a short summary of the content as well as all of the relevant biblical passages. During the 1950s, the Bialik Institute published a commentary on the entire Mishnah by Hanoch Albeck, which was considered an elaboration and expansion of Bialik's project. He also added several commentaries on the Talmud.

In 1919 in Odessa, he was also able to found the Dvir publishing house, which would later become famous. This publishing house, now based in Israel, still exists, but is now known as Kinneret Zmora-Bitan Dvir after Dvir was purchased by the Zmora-Bitan publishing house in 1986, which later merged with Kinneret.

Bialik lived in Odessa until 1921, when the Moriah publishing house was closed by Communist authorities, as a result of mounting paranoia following the Bolshevik Revolution. With the intervention of Maxim Gorki, a group of Hebrew writers were given permission by the Soviet government to leave the country. While in Odessa he had befriended the soprano Isa Kremer whom he had a profound influence on. It was through his influence that she became an exponent of Yiddish music on the concert stage; notably becoming the first woman to concertize that music.

Move to Germany

Bialik then moved, via Poland and Turkey, to Berlin, where together with his friends Ravnitzky and Shmaryahu Levin he re-established the Dvir publishing house. Bialik published in Dvir the first Hebrew language scientific journal with teachers of the rabbinical college Hochschule für die Wissenschaft des Judentums contributing. In Berlin Bialik joined a community of Jewish authors and publishers such as Samuel Joseph Agnon (sponsored by the owner of Schocken Department Stores, Salman Schocken, who later founded his own publishing house), Simon Dubnow, Israel Isidor Elyashev (Ba'al-Machshoves), Uri Zvi Greenberg, Jakob Klatzkin (founded Eschkol publishing house in Berlin), Moshe Kulbak, Jakob-Wolf Latzki-Bertoldi (founded Klal publishing house in Berlin in 1921), Simon Rawidowicz (co-founder of Klal), Salman Schneur, Nochum Shtif (Ba'al-Dimion), Shaul Tchernichovsky, elsewhere in Germany Shoshana Persitz with Omanuth publishing house in Bad Homburg v.d.H. and Martin Buber. They met in the Hebrew Club Beith haWa'ad ha'Ivri בית הועד העברי in Berlin's Scheunenviertel, or in Café Monopol, which had a Hebrew-speaking corner, as Eliezer Ben-Yehuda's son Itamar Ben-Avi recalled, and in Café des Westens (both in Berlin's more elegant western boroughs).

Bialik succeeded Saul Israel Hurwitz after his death on August 8, 1922, as Hebrew chief editor at Klal publishing house, which published 80 titles in 1922. In January 1923 Bialik's 50th birthday was celebrated in the old concert hall of the Berlin Philharmonic bringing together everybody who was anybody.

Move to Tel Aviv

In 1924, Bialik relocated with his publishing house Dvir to Tel Aviv, devoting himself to cultural activities and public affairs. Bialik was immediately recognized as a celebrated literary figure. He delivered the address that marked the opening (in 1925) of the Hebrew University in Jerusalem and was a member of its board of governors.  In 1927 he became head of the Hebrew Writers Union, a position he retained for the remainder of his life. That year, he founded the Oneg Shabbat society of Tel Aviv which sponsored communal gatherings on Shabbat afternoon to study Torah and sing. He believed that the public observance of Shabbat was essential to the preservation of the Jewish people, even though he was not an observant Jew in his private life.

Works and influence
Bialik wrote several different modes of poetry. He is perhaps most famous for his long, nationalistic poems, which call for a reawakening of the Jewish people. Bialik had his own awakening even before writing those poems, arising out of the anger and shame he felt at the Jewish response to pogroms.  In his poem "Massa Nemirov", for example, Bialik excoriated the Jews of Kishinev who had allowed their persecutors to wreak their will without raising a finger to defend themselves.

However no less effective are his passionate love poems, his personal verse, or his nature poems. Last but not least, Bialik's songs for children are a staple of Israeli nursery life. From 1908 onwards, he wrote mostly prose.

By writing his works in Hebrew, Bialik contributed significantly to the revival of the Hebrew language, which before his days existed primarily as an ancient, scholarly tongue. His influence is felt deeply in all modern Hebrew literature. The generation of Hebrew language poets who followed in Bialik's footsteps, including Jacob Steinberg and Jacob Fichman, are called "the Bialik generation".

To this day, Bialik is recognized as Israel's national poet. Bialik House, his former home at 22 Bialik Street in Tel Aviv, has been converted into a museum, and functions as a center for literary events. The municipality of Tel Aviv awards the Bialik Prize in his honor. Kiryat Bialik, a suburb of Haifa, and Givat Hen, a moshav bordering the city of Raanana, are named after him. He is the only person to have two streets named after him in the same Israeli city – Bialik Street and Hen Boulevard in Tel Aviv. There is also Bialik Hebrew Day School in Toronto, ON, Canada; Bialik High School in Montreal, QC, Canada; and a cross-communal Jewish Zionist school in Melbourne called Bialik College.  In Caracas, Venezuela, the largest Jewish community school is named Herzl-Bialik. Also in Rosario, Argentina the only Jewish school is named after him.

Bialik's poems have been translated into at least 30 languages, and set to music as popular songs. These poems, and the songs based on them, have become an essential part of the education and culture of modern Israel.

Bialik wrote most of his poems using Ashkenazi pronunciation, while modern Israeli Hebrew uses the Sephardi pronunciation or, as Miryam Segal has called it, the "new accent," an amalgam of vowels and consonantal sounds from variety of sources. Consequently, Bialik's poems are rarely recited in the meter in which they were written, though according to Segal, the Ashkenazi (penultimate) stress pattern is somewhat preserved,  and Bialik comes to stand for the Diasporan desire constituting Hebrew-Israeli identity.

Death
Bialik died in Vienna, Austria, on July 4, 1934, from a sudden heart attack a week after having had a successful prostate operation. He was buried in Tel Aviv; a large mourning procession followed from his home on the street named after him, to his final resting place.

Gallery

Notes

References

Selected bibliography in English

Selected Writings (poetry and prose) Hasefer, 1924; New York, New Palestine, 1926; Philadelphia, Jewish Publication Society, 1939; New York, Histadrut Ivrit of America, 1948; New York, Bloch, 1965; New York, Union of American Hebrew Congregations, 1972; Tel Aviv, Dvir and the Jerusalem Post, 1981; Columbus, Alpha, 1987
The Short Friday Tel Aviv, Hashaot, 1944
Knight of Onions and Knight of Garlic New York, Jordan, 1939
Random Harvest – The Novellas of C. N. Bialik, Boulder, Colorado, Westview Press (Perseus Books), 1999
The Modern Hebrew Poem Itself (2003), 
Songs from Bialik: Selected Poems of Hayim Nahman Bialik, Syracuse, Syracuse University Press, 2000
Selected Poems: Bilingual Edition, (translated by Ruth Nevo), Jerusalem: Dvir, 1981.

Further reading 
 
 Tamar Rotem, "The Flower is Forgot: the life and works of national poet Hayyim Nahman Bialik are not taught properly", Haaretz Newspaper ,17/07/2001 
 Ziva Shamir, "Spiritual Merchant & Motionless Wanderer: Dramatis Personae and Speaking Voice in Bialik's Works","Bikort & Parshanut" Magazin 2002 
 Ziva Shamir, "A Thousand Mouths Anointed With Poison: The Anatomy of Modern Anti-semitism in Bialik's Oeuvre", "KESHER" Journal #33, Spring 2003.
 Ziva Shamir, "No story, no history", Bialik's Stories from Texture to Context (Lecture circa 1998), www.zivashamir.com

External links
 
 
 
 Hayim Nahman Bialik Personal Manuscripts and Letters

1873 births
1934 deaths
People from Zhytomyr Oblast
People from Zhitomirsky Uyezd
Ukrainian Jews
Ashkenazi Jews in Mandatory Palestine
Modern Hebrew writers
Hebrew-language poets
Jewish folklorists
German emigrants to Mandatory Palestine
Jewish writers
Kishinev pogrom
Burials at Trumpeldor Cemetery
Yiddish-language poets